The Glenella Railway Station is a flag stop located in Glenella, Manitoba, Canada.  The station is served by Via Rail's Winnipeg – Churchill train.

Footnotes 

Via Rail stations in Manitoba
Railway stations in Manitoba